USS Truxtun (DDG-103) is an  currently in service with the United States Navy. She is named for American Naval hero, Commodore Thomas Truxtun (1755–1822), one of the first six commanders appointed by George Washington, to the newly formed U.S. Navy. She is the sixth U.S. naval warship to bear his name.

Construction
Truxtuns keel was laid down on 11 April 2005. During construction at Ingalls Shipbuilding, Pascagoula, Mississippi, she suffered a major electrical fire on 20 May 2006, engulfing two levels and causing damage estimated to be worth millions of dollars. She was launched on 17 April 2007, then christened on 2 June 2007, in Pascagoula, with Truxtun's descendants, Susan Scott Martin and Carol Leigh Roelker, serving as sponsors, and commissioned on 25 April 2009, in Charleston, South Carolina.  the ship is part of Destroyer Squadron 26 based out of Naval Station Norfolk.

Ship history
On 22 March 2009, Truxtun answered distress call, after the 45-foot sailing vessel Calypso Queen reported a broken mast and sail, as well as electrical and mechanical casualties in the Gulf of Mexico. The crew, a man and a woman, were transferred to Truxtun and required no medical assistance.

In 2012, the US Navy contracted with L3 Technologies to develop a fuel-efficient hybrid electric drive train for the Flight IIA Arleigh Burke guided missile destroyers. Truxtun was fitted with the permanent magnet motor system in 2012, under a research and development contract with General Atomics. In March 2018, the US Navy announced that the trial program to install hybrid electric drives in 34 destroyers would be cancelled leaving Truxtun as the only ship so fitted.

On 6 March 2014, Truxtun departed Greece, and sailed to the Black Sea, to conduct training with the Romanian and Bulgarian navies. On 5 March 2014, Turkish authorities gave permission to a US Navy warship to pass through the Bosphorus Straits. The deployment of Truxtun, along with sister ship , to the Black Sea, was intended as a "strategic reassurance" for former Soviet republics and satellite states concerned about the annexation of Crimea by the Russian Federation

On 10 August 2020, Truxtun completed a deployment with the  Carrier Strike Group, without any port calls, that lasted for almost seven months.

In popular culture

References

External links

 Official ship's site
navsource.org: USS Truxtun

 

Arleigh Burke-class destroyers
Ships built in Pascagoula, Mississippi
2007 ships
Carrier Strike Group Two
Annexation of Crimea by the Russian Federation